This is a list of existing major film festivals, sorted by continent.

The world's oldest film festival is the Mostra internazionale d'arte cinematografica (Venice Film Festival), while the most prestigious film festivals in the world, known as the "Big Three", are (listed chronologically according to the date of foundation): Venice, Cannes and Berlin. The most prestigious film festivals in North America are Sundance and Toronto.

Africa

Asia

Europe

North America

Oceania

South America and the Caribbean

Traveling and online festivals

See also
 List of film awards
 List of film festivals in South America
 List of film festivals in Europe
 List of film festivals in North and Central America
 List of film festivals in Oceania
 List of short film festivals
 List of women's film festivals
 Lists of films

Notes

References

External links

 Movie festivals and events worldwide at the Internet Movie Database

Lists of film festivals by continent